Bobby Jones, PhD (28 February 1932 - 21 December 1992) was a noted American educator who distinguished himself by becoming the first African American to earn tenure at Mercer University, a highly selective private university. Jones later became chair of the Education Department there. He was instrumental in the development of innovative teaching techniques that are used as standards throughout the education industry to this date. He inspired hundreds of students to go on to become educators as highlighted in A Joyful Passion for Teaching.

Jones is also credited with assisting in destroying the racial divide that existed throughout central Georgia in the novel Macon Black and White. Jones devoted his life to helping others realize their goals. He was instrumental in the establishment of Mercer University's first Upward Bound Program where he mentored aspiring, educationally talented under-privileged youth. Jones assisted them in the pursuit and achievement of their collegiate aspirations.

References

 
 
 

1932 births
2001 deaths
20th-century American educators
African-American academics
20th-century African-American educators